Serena Williams's 2006 tennis season was hampered by injury, She was only able to play 4 tournaments and was outside of the top 100 for the first time since 1997.

Year summary

Australian Open

Williams did not have any preparation into defending her title at the Australian Open. Williams faced China's Li Na and won in three sets dropping the second set in a tie-break, but winning the first and third set comfortably. In the second round she defeated Frenchwoman Camille Pin dropping just four games. Williams then faced Daniela Hantuchová in the round of 32. Williams dropped the first set by winning only a single game. In the second set Williams saved three match points in the twelfth game to push it to a tie-break. Hantuchová took the tie-break on her fifth match point. The loss meant that Williams will drop outside of the top 40 since entering it in 1998.

Early hard courts, clay court and grass season
She then withdrew from tournaments in Tokyo (citing her lack of fitness) and Dubai and from the Tier I NASDAQ-100 Open in Key Biscayne (citing a knee injury and lack of fitness). On April 10, her ranking fell out of the top 100 for the first time since November 16, 1997. Shortly after, she announced that she would miss both the French Open and Wimbledon because of a chronic knee injury. She said that she would not be able to compete before "the end of the summer", on doctor's orders.

US Open Series

Western & Southern Financial Group Women's Open
Williams came back ranked no. 139 at the Western & Southern Financial Group Women's Open and faced world no. 11 Anastasia Myskina, she won easily losing only four games. She then faced Bethanie Mattek in the next round and won, once again just dropping four games. The following round, Williams defeated compatriot Amy Frazier, once again losing only four games for the third match in a row. In the semifinals, she took on Russian Vera Zvonareva and fell in straight sets.

JPMorgan Chase Open
In her only third tournament of the year, she played the JPMorgan Chase Open. She cruised pass through her first two matches Maria Kirilenko and Ashley Harkleroad winning in straight sets. In the third round she faced Daniela Hantuchová and lost the first set winning only a game. However, Williams came back winning the next two at three. In the quarterfinals, Williams faced compatriot Meghann Shaughnessy, the first set went to a tie-breaker, which Shaughnessy won. However, Williams came back and won the next two sets easily. Williams then faced Jelena Janković in the semifinals. Janković broke Williams in tenth game of the first set to take the set. Janković took control of the second set by breaking Williams in the fourth game and that paved way for Janković to advance to the final.

US Open
Williams was unable to enter US Open as a direct entry, but received a wildcard. Williams began her Open against Spaniard Lourdes Domínguez Lino and quickly dispatched the 41 ranked player in straight sets. For the third time in four tournaments Williams has played, she once again faced Daniela Hantuchová, Hantuchová served for the first set in the ninth game, but Williams pegged her back, breaking and winning the next three games. Williams then took the second set to advance. Williams then faced a young up-and-comer in Ana Ivanovic and cruised through with a straight set win to become the first wildcard entry to advance to the round of 16. In the fourth round, Williams faced top seed Amelie Mauresmo. Mauresmo took the first set with a single break, however in the second set Williams came back winning it in a bagel. In the final set Mauresmo broke in the fifth game of the third set and won the last three games to advance.

All matches

Singles matches

Tournament schedule

Singles schedule
Williams' 2006 singles tournament schedule is as follows:

Yearly records

Head–to–head matchups
Ordered by percentage of wins

 Li Na 1–0
 Camille Pin 1–0
 Anastasia Myskina 1–0
 Bethanie Mattek-Sands 1–0
 Amy Frazier 1–0
 Maria Kirilenko 1–0
 Ashley Harkleroad 1–0
 Meghann Shaughnessy 1–0
 Lourdes Domínguez Lino 1–0
 Ana Ivanovic 1–0
 Daniela Hantuchová 2–1
 Vera Zvonareva 0–1
 Jelena Janković 0–1
 Amelie Mauresmo 0–1

Earnings

 Figures in United States dollars (USD) unless noted.

See also
Venus Williams
2006 WTA Tour

References

External links

Serena Williams tennis seasons
Williams, Serena
2006 in American tennis